Daroga State Park is a  public recreation area on the Columbia River located  north of Orondo at the edge of Washington's Channeled Scablands. The state park has  of river shoreline and offers picnicking, camping, boating, fishing, swimming, waterskiing, birdwatching, wildlife viewing, and other athletic facilities. The park is managed by the Washington State Parks and Recreation Commission under a lease agreement with the owners, the Chelan County Public Utility District.

History
The park occupies land that was once part of the agricultural holdings of orchard man Grady Auvil. The name "Daroga" was coined using the names of the Auvil brothers — David, Robert and Grady — and was first applied to the Daroga peach. Following construction of the Rocky Reach Dam and the creation of Lake Entiat, the park was created on a flooded portion of the Auvil orchard.

References

External links

Daroga State Park Washington State Parks and Recreation Commission 
Daroga State Park Map Washington State Parks and Recreation Commission 

State parks of Washington (state)
Parks in Douglas County, Washington
Protected areas established in 1981